This is a list of Chinese national-type primary schools (SJK(C)) in Terengganu, Malaysia. As of June 2022, there are 10 Chinese primary schools with a total of 2,152 students.

List of Chinese national-type primary schools in Terengganu

See also
Lists of Chinese national-type primary schools in Malaysia

References

Schools in Terengganu
Terengganu
Chinese-language schools in Malaysia